Atul Agnihotri (born 8 July 1970) is an Indian actor, producer and director. He started his Bollywood career as an actor, went on to direct two films, and found success as a film producer. He is best known for his debut film Sir (1993), which was the most notable film of his career and featured him as the lead protagonist. His other notable films were Aatish: Feel the Fire (1994) and Krantiveer (1994).

Early and personal life
Atul Agnihotri was born into a Punjabi Brahmin Hindu family, the son of Rohit Agnihotri, an actor of yesteryear who quit films after a brief stint and later tried his hand at business. Agnihotri lost his father at a young age and the responsibility of supporting his family came upon him. Agnihotri's first cousin is actress Rati Agnihotri, who lived with them in Mumbai for two years and made her entry into films during that time; essentially, this inspired Atul to join films likewise.

Agnihotri is married to producer/designer Alvira Khan Agnihotri. He has a sister as well. His wife is the daughter of scriptwriter Salim Khan and sister of actors Salman Khan, Arbaaz Khan and Sohail Khan. their first child Ayaan Agnihotri born on 12 June 1998 and had daughter Alizeh Agnihotri  born on 21 September 2000.

Career

Acting
Agnihotri's career stretches back to 1983 when he made a brief appearance as a child artist in Pasand Apni Apni (1983) in which his cousin Rati Agnihotri was the heroine. Inspired by her success, and by the memory of his father's brief stint as an actor, he made his acting debut with Mahesh Bhatt's Sir (1993), which emerged as a commercial and critical success. He went on to act in several other films throughout the 1990s and early 2000s with his most notable hits being Krantiveer (1994), Naaraz (1994), Aatish (1994), Chachi 420 (1997), Yeshwant (1997), and Hum Tumhare Hain Sanam (2002).

As film director
After being restricted to supporting and second lead roles, Agnihotri abandoned acting and turned to film direction. He made his directorial debut with the 2004 film Dil Ne Jise Apna Kahaa which starred his brother-in-law Salman Khan along with Bhoomika Chawla and Preity Zinta in the lead roles. 

Agnihotri persisted with direction, and began work in 2008 on the film Hello. He was both producer and director of this film, which starred his other brother-in-law Sohail Khan, along with Isha Koppikar and Sharman Joshi. The film was released on 10 October 2008 to a poor reception at the box office and proved to be a flop.

As film producer
Agnihotri's second directorial venture, Hello (2008) had been the first film produced by him. His second film as a producer was Bodyguard, starring his brother-in-law Salman Khan with Kareena Kapoor. The film was directed by Siddique, who is otherwise active in Malayalam cinema and who had directed the original Malayalam version of the same film. 

In 2014, Agnihotri produced his next film, O Teri starring relative newcomers Pulkit Samrat, Bilal Amrohi and Sarah Jane Dias. The film was directed by debutant director Umesh Bisht; thus, it gave an opening to a large number of newcomers. 

Agnihotris next project is producing Ali Abbas Zafar's Bharat starring Salman Khan, set to release Eid 2019. Bharat will be an official adaptation of 2014 Korean film, ‘Ode to My Father’ which depicted modern Korean history from the 1950s to the present day through the life of an ordinary man. Agnihotri confirmed: "It’s the journey of a country and also a person, both of whom go by the name of Bharat."

Filmography

As actor
 Pasand Apni Apni (1983) – Anil
 Sir (1993) – Karan
 Aasoo Bane Angaarey (1993) - Chanda's Brother
 Aatish (1994) – Avi (Baba's Brother)
 Krantiveer (1994) – Atul Dhayal
 Naaraaz (1994) – Ajay Pandit
 Gunehgar (1995) – Rohit
 Veergati (1995) – Shlok
 Bambai Ka Babu (1996) – Amit
 Yeshwant (1997) – Inspector John Frank
 Jeevan Yudh (1997) – Rohit Rai
 Chachi 420 (1997) – Himself (in song "Gare Dore")
 Yeh Aashiqui Meri (1998) – Shekhar Choudhry
 Khote Sikkey (1998) – Rohit
 Hote Hote Pyaar Ho Gaya (1999) – Atul (Bunty)
 Kohram (1999)
 Piyo Gayo Pardesh (2000)
 Hum Tumhare Hain Sanam (2002) – Prashant
 Jaani Dushman: Ek Anokhi Kahani (2002) – Man driving red car
 Sanam Teri Kasam (2009) – Gopal
 Vaada Raha... I Promise (2009)
 Champak Lal ki Shaadi babulal ke sath (2019)

Director 
 Dil Ne Jise Apna Kahaa (2004)
 Hello (2008)

Producer 
 Hello (2008)
 Bodyguard (2011)
 O Teri (2014)
 Bharat (2019)
 Radhe (2021 film)

References

External links
 

Living people
Punjabi people
Film directors from Delhi
Indian male film actors
Film producers from Delhi
Salim Khan family
1970 births